Get Krack!n is an Australian comedy series which was created by and stars comedians Kate McCartney and Kate McLennan. The series is a satire of breakfast television and features McCartney and McLennan playing versions of themselves hosting Get Krack!n, a low-budget early-morning television programme.

Premise
Get Krack!n is a satirical comedy show that pokes fun at breakfast television shows. Kate McCartney and Kate McLennan play fictional versions of themselves hosting early-morning television show "Get Krack!n". McLennan is upbeat to the point of being irritating and unprofessional while McCartney is more realistic, but frequently tactless and socially awkward. The show is run on a shoestring budget, funded by commercial sponsors who manufacture and market questionable products. The production crew are either under-trained or employed as part of a prison work release programme, the show is constantly beset by technical problems, and the guests are unqualified "experts". McCartney and McLennan attempt to remain enthusiastic, but inadvertently reveal dysfunctional and sociopathic behaviour as things go wrong.

Reception
The last episode of the second series of Get Krack!n, featuring Miranda Tapsell and Nakkiah Lui and co-written by Lui, trended on Twitter, and was widely lauded as hilarious, ground-breaking, hard-hitting satire. It drew an angry response from right-wing commentator Andrew Bolt.

Episodes

<onlyinclude>

Series 1 (2017)

Series 2 (2019)

See also
The Katering Show, an earlier series by the pair.

References

External links
 Get Krack!n Official Homepage 
 

2017 Australian television series debuts
2019 Australian television series endings
Australian Broadcasting Corporation original programming
Australian comedy television series